Giving Back to Africa is a 501(c)(3) Bloomington, Indiana-based non-profit organization dedicated to the long-term mission of educating young people in the Democratic Republic of Congo. In partnership with local Congolese educational institutions and non-governmental organizations, its goal is to empower GBA beneficiaries - through service-centered education - to become servant-leaders capable of taking control of their own lives while serving as change agents in their local communities and throughout the Democratic Republic of Congo. The organization was featured in the Bloom Magazine, December 2008/January 2009 issue.

References

External links
 
 youtube.com/watch?v=7fKxYKiqCOQ
 From the Heart of Indiana to the Heart of Africa

Bloomington, Indiana
Educational foundations in the United States
Nonpartisan organizations in the United States
Foreign charities operating in the Democratic Republic of the Congo
Non-profit organizations based in Indiana